Estadio Kenny Serracín is a multi-use stadium in David, Panama.  It is currently used for baseball matches and is the home stadium of Chiriquí baseball team.  The stadium holds 8,500 people.

History

Used to be called Estadio 3 de noviembre until 1976.
Atletico Chiriqui soccer team used to play before the construction of
San Cristobal soccer field.

Baseball venues in Panama
Buildings and structures in Chiriquí Province